The 19033 / 19034 Gujarat Queen is an Express train belonging to Indian Railways that run between  and  in India. It operates as train number 19033 from Valsad to Ahmedabad Junction and as train number 19034 in the reverse direction.

Coaches

Gujarat Queen presently has 3 AC Chair Car, 3 2nd Class seating & 11 General Unreserved coaches.

As with most train services in India, coach composition may be amended at the discretion of Indian Railways depending on demand.

Service
19033 Gujarat Queen covers the distance of 298 kilometres in 6 hours 20 mins (48.32 km/hr) & 6 hours 30 mins as 19034 Gujarat Queen (48.99 km/hr).

As the average speed of the train is below 55 km/hr, as per Indian Railways rules, its fare does not include a Superfast surcharge.

Route & Halts

The important halts of the train are:

Schedule

Gallery

Traction

It is hauls end to end by a Vadodara-based WAP-5 / WAP-4E or Vatva Loco Shed-based WAP-4 locomotive.

References 

Transport in Valsad
Transport in Ahmedabad
Named passenger trains of India
Rail transport in Gujarat
Express trains in India